This article details the qualifying phase for shooting at the 2024 Summer Olympics. 300 quota places for the Games are entitled to the shooters coming from their respective NOCs, based on the results at designated ISSF supervised Championships subjected to the ISSF rules from 14 August 2022 to 9 June 2024. Host nation France has been guaranteed twelve quota places with one in each of the individual events. Highest-ranked shooter, who has not qualified yet or whose NOC does not have a berth in any of the twelve individual events, will obtain a direct Olympic quota place through the World Rankings. The remaining sixteen quota places are available to the eligible NOCs under the Tripartite Commission Invitation to attain a maximum number of 340.

Timeline

Qualification summary

50 m rifle three positions men

10 m air rifle men

25 m rapid fire pistol men

10 m air pistol men

Trap men

Skeet men

50 m rifle three positions women

10 m air rifle women

25 m pistol women

10 m air pistol women

Trap women

Skeet women

Notes

See also
 Shooting at the 2024 Summer Paralympics – Qualification

References

Qualification for the 2024 Summer Olympics
Qualification
Olympics
Olympics
Olympics